Celaenorrhinus spilothyrus, commonly known as the Sri Lanka black flat, is a species of butterfly in the family Hesperiidae. It is found in India and Sri Lanka.

References

Butterflies described in 1868
spilothyrus
Butterflies of Asia
Butterflies of Sri Lanka